The Kuwait Emir Cup is the premier cup competition involving teams from the Kuwaiti Premier League and the Kuwaiti Division One league.

The 2012 edition is the 49th to be held and has been brought forward from its usual slot to be played over two calendar years.

Defending Emir Cup champions Kazma and defending Kuwaiti Premier League title holders Al Qadsia received byes to the Quarter-Final round.

The winners qualify for the 2013 AFC Cup.

First round

Quarter finals

Semi finals

Final

2011-12
2011–12 in Kuwaiti football
2011–12 domestic association football cups